The John H. and Christina Yost House is a historic house in Lincoln, Nebraska. It was built by Nathan Bishop with red bricks and limestone in 1912, and designed in the Renaissance Revival style by architect George A. Brilinghof. The owner, John Y. Yost, was a Russian immigrant of German descent who first arrived in Wisconsin in 1876 and moved to Nebraska in 1877. He lived in the house with his wife Christina, who was also a Russian immigrant, until his death in 1939. It has been listed on the National Register of Historic Places since April 26, 2002.

References

National Register of Historic Places in Lincoln, Nebraska
Renaissance Revival architecture in Nebraska
Houses completed in 1912